Hale Aina Awards are Honolulu Magazine's annual dining awards. The Hale Aina Awards are voted on by magazine readers and subscribers and published annually in the January issue of Honolulu.

The Hale Aina Awards are announced in November through a gala celebration where restaurant owners and chefs find out for the first time what award and at what level they have won.

Categories range from Best Restaurant by Island (Oahu, Kauai, Maui and Big Island) and Little Restaurant You Love to Best Hawaiian Cuisine and Most Romantic Restaurant.

History
The Hale Aina Awards were created in 1984 by Honolulu Magazine. It was the first Hawaii dining award given by a local media company. Prior to that the only dining awards were given by mainland travel publications.

"Hale Aina" is the closest equivalent to the word "restaurant" in the Hawaiian language. It literally means "eating place" and is now mostly synonymous with these awards.

Restaurant of the Year
Restaurant of the Year is the highest honor bestowed each year to one Hawaii restaurant. Alan Wong's Restaurant holds the most Hale Aina Award Restaurant of the Year wins.

Past winners
1985 - The Third Floor 
1986 - Michel's at the Colony Surf
1987 - Michel's at the Colony Surf
1988 - Matteo's
1989 - Michel's at the Colony Surf
1990 - Bali by the Sea
1991 - Golden Dragon
1992 - Maile Restaurant
1993 - Maile Restaurant
1994 - 3660 On the Rise
1995 - Roy's
1996 - Alan Wong's
1997 - Alan Wong's
1998 - Hoku's
1999 - Alan Wong's
2000 - Alan Wong's
2001 - Alan Wong's
2002 - Roy's
2003 - Hoku's
2004 - Roy's
2005 - Alan Wong's
2006 - Alan Wong's
2007 - Alan Wong's
2008 - Alan Wong's
2009 - Alan Wong's
2010 - Roy's
2011 - Roy's

Hale Aina Ohana
Over the year's the awards have helped to generate a 501-c-3 non-profit organization called the Hale Aina Ohana.

The Hale Aina Ohana has a mission to provide culinary students and professionals in Hawaii access to cutting-edge knowledge and techniques through educational opportunities and programs featuring visiting chefs and Hawaii's own Master chefs and restaurant industry supporters.

The Hale Aina Ohana is run separately from the Hale Aina Awards and has their executive director and advisory committee that handle the programming and outreach.

A silent auction at the Hale Aina Awards Celebration event is one of the fund raising sources for the Ohana. Other fundraisers include their annual golf tournament, the Hawaii Hospitality, Lodging and Foodservice Expo and private contributors.

External links
 Official website
 Dining writer John Heckathorn's recap of the first 25 years of the awards.
 Hale Aina Ohana website

Food and drink awards